Fosbery may refer to:

Places
 Fosbery, Manitoba until 1897, former name of Laurier, Manitoba

Things
 The Webley-Fosbery Automatic Revolver

People

Surname
 George Vincent Fosbery (1832–1907), British Lieutenant Colonel who won the Victoria Cross, and a designer of firearms
 H.J.W. Fosbery, British tennis player finalist at the 1893 Wimbledon Championships and 1905 Wimbledon Championships
 Thomas Vincent Fosbery (1807–1875), hymnologist, chaplain to Bishop Samuel Wilberforce, founder of the Girls' Friendly Society
 William Fosbery, High Sheriff of Limerick City in 1781

Middle/maiden name
 George Fosbery Lyster (1821–1899), British engineer and dock builder
 Eileen Marjorie Fosbery Chambers (1906–1989), New Zealand nurse and hospital administrator